Alwin Brück (23 September 1931 – 14 February 2020) was a German politician who was a member of the Social Democratic Party of Germany (SPD). He was Parliamentary Secretary of the Federal Ministry of Economic Cooperation and Development from 1974 to 1982.

Biography
In 1947, Brück joined the Socialist Youth of Germany – Falcons. He was regional president of the Falcons in Saarland from 1956 to 1967. He volunteered at Saar-Volksstimme from 1949 to 1951, and then worked as an editorial consultant until 1953. In 1955, he began working at Saarbrücker Allgemeine Zeitung, where he became an assistant editor. In 1952, Brück assisted in the foundation of the DSP, which did not reach Saarland until 1955. In 1960, he became a member of the executive committee of the DSP in Saarland. From 1960 to 1973, Brück served as a member of the municipal council of his hometown, Heusweiler. From 1965 to 1990, he was a member of the Bundestag. In the Bundestag, he was President of the Economic Cooperation Committee from 1969 to 1974. In May 1974, he became Parliamentary State Secretary of the Economic Cooperation Committee under the appointment of Chancellor Helmut Schmidt. After the election of Helmut Kohl, Brück left the federal government in 1982. In 1987, Brück was elected to the Bundestag with 46.4% of the vote, representing Saarbrücken.

Alwin Brück died on 14 February 2020 at the age of 88.

Honors
Saarland Order of Merit (1976)
Honorary Senator at Saarland University (1981)

References

1931 births
2020 deaths
People from Saarbrücken (district)
Social Democratic Party of Germany politicians
Members of the Bundestag 1987–1990
Substitute Members of the Parliamentary Assembly of the Council of Europe
Commanders Crosses of the Order of Merit of the Federal Republic of Germany
Recipients of the Saarland Order of Merit